Kalchev is a surname. Notable people with the surname include:

Andon Kalchev (1910–1948), Bulgarian scientist and army officer
Denislav Kalchev (born 1973), Bulgarian swimmer

Bulgarian-language surnames